Helmut Böck is an Austrian diplomat and Ambassador. On 1 July 2008 he was formally accredited as the Permanent Representative of Austria to the United Nations in Vienna.

Helmut Böck holds a doctoral degree in Law and a translator's diploma for English and Spanish from the University of Innsbruck, Austria, a master's degree in International Relations from the London School of Economics, and a postgraduate Certificate of Advanced European Studies from the College of Europe in Bruges.

He also served as Ambassador to the Republic of Korea (2001–2005) and Consul General in Hong Kong (1997–2001). Prior to his appointment as Permanent Representative in 2008, he served as Head of the Department for International Organizations at the Ministry for Foreign Affairs of Austria, from 2005 to 2008. He served as Ambassador and Permanent Representative of Austria to the United Nations, IAEA, UNIDO and CTBTO (PrepCom) in Vienna, Austria till 2012. After that he was appointed Ambassador Extraordinary and Plenipotentiary of the Republic of Austria to the Commonwealth of Australia, New Zealand, Papua New Guinea, Fiji, Vanuatu, Kiribati, Samoa and 6 other Pacific States, and served at the Austrian Embassy in Canberra, Australia (2012-2016).

From 2017-2021 he served as Austrian Consul General at the Austrian Consulate General in New York, USA.

References

Austrian diplomats
College of Europe alumni
Alumni of the London School of Economics
Year of birth missing (living people)
Living people
Permanent Representatives of Austria to the United Nations
Ambassadors of Austria to South Korea